"Both Sides, Now" is a song by Canadian singer-songwriter Joni Mitchell. First recorded by Judy Collins, it appeared on the US singles chart during the fall of 1968. The next year it was included on Mitchell's album Clouds, and became one of her best-known songs. It has since been recorded by dozens of artists, including Dion in 1968, Clannad with Paul Young in 1991, and Mitchell herself who re-recorded the song with an orchestral arrangement on her 2000 album Both Sides Now.

In 2004, Rolling Stone ranked "Both Sides, Now" at number 170 on its list of the 500 Greatest Songs.

Background
Mitchell has said that "Both Sides, Now" was inspired by a passage in Henderson the Rain King, a 1959 novel by Saul Bellow.I was reading ... Henderson the Rain King on a plane and early in the book Henderson ... is also up in a plane. He's on his way to Africa and he looks down and sees these clouds. I put down the book, looked out the window and saw clouds too, and I immediately started writing the song. I had no idea that the song would become as popular as it did. "... more likely 'And I dreamed down at the clouds, and thought that when I was a kid I had dreamed up at them, and having dreamed at the clouds from both sides as no other generation of men has done, one should be able to accept his death very easily. Chapter 5, paragraph 7.

"Both Sides, Now" appears in the album "Joni Mitchell: Live at the Second Fret 1966" (2014, All Access Records, AACD0120), a live performance on November 17, 1966, from The Second Fret in Philadelphia, PA, which was broadcast live by WRTI, Temple University's radio station. This suggests that Mitchell wrote the song before 1967 (the year of composition cited in the Los Angeles Times article above) and precedes the first Judy Collins release in 1967.

"Both Sides, Now" is written in F-sharp major. Mitchell used a guitar tuning of D-A-D-F#-A-D with a capo at the fourth fret. The song uses a modified I–IV–V chord progression.

2000 re-recording
Mitchell re-recorded the song in a lush, orchestrated fashion for her 2000 album Both Sides Now. The recording won arranger Vince Mendoza a Grammy Award for Best Instrumental Arrangement Accompanying Vocalist(s).

In April 2000, two months after the album's release, Mitchell sang the song with a 70-piece orchestra at the end of an all-star celebration for her at the Hammerstein Ballroom in New York City.

The 2000 version is played during an emotional scene featuring Emma Thompson in the 2003 film Love Actually. It was also played during the 2010 Winter Olympics opening ceremony.

Certifications

Judy Collins version

Shortly after Mitchell wrote the song, Judy Collins recorded the first commercially released version for her 1967 Wildflowers album. In October 1968 the same version was released as a single, reaching number 8 on the U.S pop singles charts by December. It reached number 6 in Canada. In early 1969 it won a Grammy Award for Best Folk Performance. The record peaked at number 3 on Billboards Easy Listening survey and "Both Sides, Now" has become one of Collins' signature songs. Mitchell disliked Collins' recording of the song, despite the publicity that its success generated for Mitchell's own career. The Collins version is featured as the opening title music of the 2014 romantic comedy And So It Goes, and as the end title music of the 2018 supernatural horror film Hereditary. It also features in the first teaser trailer for Toy Story 4. The song features prominently in the season 6 finale of TV show Mad Men, and signals a moment of anagnorisis between Don Draper and his daughter Sally.

Chart history

Weekly charts

Year-end charts

Notable recordings
Mitchell's song has been recorded by many other artists over the decades. Among the best-known versions are:
Dion recorded the song under the title "From Both Sides Now" on his album Dion. His cover reached number 91 in the US.
Euson released the song as a single in 1970, reaching number 7 on the Dutch Top 40.
Viola Wills covered the song in her unique dance/Hi-NRG style and released it as a single (from her Dare to Dream album), peaking at #35 on the UK charts in 1985. 
Clannad released a version as a duet with British singer Paul Young for the 1991 motion picture Switch. It was the only chart appearance for Clannad on the Canadian RPM 100 Singles Chart.
Emilia Jones performed the song for the 2021 film CODA, as her character's audition for the Berklee College of Music. During her performance, she signs the lyrics in American Sign Language to her watching family, all of whom are deaf.

References 

1967 songs
1968 singles
Songs written by Joni Mitchell
Joni Mitchell songs
Judy Collins songs
Dion DiMucci songs
1991 singles
Clannad songs
Paul Young songs
Grammy Award for Best Ethnic or Traditional Folk Recording
Grammy Award for Best Instrumental Arrangement Accompanying Vocalist(s)
Song recordings produced by Joni Mitchell
Song recordings produced by Paul A. Rothchild
Elektra Records singles